Belleville is a St. Louis MetroLink station. The station bisects Scheel Street in the northern section of Belleville, Illinois approximately one mile (1.6 km) from the center of town. It has a MetroBus transfer and a large parking lot on the southwest side of the tracks that features 287 park and ride spaces and 34 long-term spaces. Like the Emerson Park Transit Center, this station also includes a small retail building with four storefronts near the bus boarding plaza.

The Belleville station has a connection to the St. Clair County Transit District's 14 mile (22.5 km) MetroBikeLink shared-use path system. This was the first segment of the MetroBikeLink system when it opened in 2002 and consisted of a 4 mile (6.4 km) trail, running from the Swansea station to Southwestern Illinois College. Just south of the Belleville station, trail users can connect to the Orchard Loop Connector.

On June 26, 2022, Citizens for Modern Transit, the St. Clair County Transit District, AARP in St. Louis, and Metro Transit unveiled the “Transit Stop Transformation” project at the Belleville Transit Center. The team overseeing this project converted the concrete area between the bus bays and MetroLink entrance into an interactive and engaging space that boasts a vibrant-colored “Art Grows in Belleville” theme. The revitalized space features new custom bike racks, shade structures, a Belleville city logo sign, benches, planters and elevated window artwork.

Station layout

References

External links
 St. Louis Metro
Station from Google Maps Street View

St. Clair County Transit District
MetroLink stations in St. Clair County, Illinois
Red Line (St. Louis MetroLink)
Railway stations in the United States opened in 2001